The Hamilton Masonic Lodge is a historic brick building built in 1873, located in Hamilton, Virginia.  Built in the Italianate style, it historically served as a Masonic meeting hall and (until the 1920s) as a school for grades 1−12.

It was listed on the National Register of Historic Places in 1999.

No Masonic lodges meet in the building today, and its original 1873-dated cornerstone was (as of the 1999 NRHP-listing) on display at another Masonic lodge building several miles away.

References

Clubhouses on the National Register of Historic Places in Virginia
National Register of Historic Places in Loudoun County, Virginia
Italianate architecture in Virginia
Masonic buildings completed in 1873
School buildings completed in 1873
Buildings and structures in Loudoun County, Virginia
Former Masonic buildings in Virginia
1873 establishments in Virginia